The Marsha Stern Talmudical Academy, also known as Yeshiva University High School for Boys (YUHSB), MTA (Manhattan Talmudical Academy) or TMSTA, is an Orthodox Jewish day school (or yeshiva) and the boys' prep school of Yeshiva University (YU) in the Washington Heights neighborhood in the New York City borough of Manhattan. It is the brother school to the Samuel H. Wang Yeshiva University High School for Girls.

History

The Talmudical Academy (TA), as it was originally called, was founded in 1916 by Rabbi Dr. Bernard Revel. He had become president of the institution that was to become Yeshiva University a year earlier, in 1915, when the "Rabbinical College of America" (a short-lived name) had been formed from the merger of two older schools, an elementary school founded in 1886 and a rabbinical seminary founded in 1896. As the elementary school soon ceased to exist, the high school is thus one of the oldest components of the University.

TA was the first academic Jewish high school in America, and the first ever to feature a dual curriculum, now standard in Jewish schools, of Judaic and secular studies. It was originally located on the Lower East Side, and moved to Washington Heights with the rest of Yeshiva in the late 1920s. The building originally planned for the High School alone was shared with the other schools of the University for many years before the campus expanded; today, that building is almost entirely occupied by the High School, and the other buildings of the University's main campus (including a dormitory for college students) surround it.

TA was later joined by a brother school, the Brooklyn Talmudical Academy ("BTA"), founded in the 1940s. While the Manhattan school remained, officially, "TA," it became popularly known as "MTA," the Manhattan Talmudical Academy, and, rarely, the Uptown Talmudical Academy, or "UTA." While the name "MTA" has never been official, it remains the most popular name for the school. Two girls' high schools were founded as well, Central Yeshiva High School in Brooklyn in the 1950s and a Manhattan school in the 1960s. Eventually, all four were eventually simply named by borough and gender, e.g., "Yeshiva University High School for Boys- Manhattan," but the popular names remained.

In 1967, the Brooklyn school moved to a joint campus created by repurposing the historical Vitagraph Studios in the Midwood section of Brooklyn.  In the 1970s, they were closed and merged  into their Manhattan counterparts.  In the 1980s, the girls' school was merged into a Queens school. The latter is now called "Samuel H. Wang Yeshiva University High School for Girls" (or simply "Wang"), but is still commonly referred to as "Central," while the boys' school, since the 1970s, has been known as "The Marsha Stern Talmudical Academy- Yeshiva University High School for Boys" (or simply "TMSTA" or, more recently, "MSTA" and now, "MTA"), but is still commonly referred to as "MTA." Principals of the school included the founding principal, Shelley Safire, and Rabbis David Weinbach (1973-1987), Mordechai Spiegelman (1987-1991), George Finkelstein (1991-1995), Michael Taubes (1995-1999 and 2011-2016), Michael Hecht (1999-2005), Mark Gottlieb and Yaakov Sklar (2005-2011), and Josh Kahn (2016-present).

The school's enrollment peaked during the '60s and '70s, when relatively few competitor schools existed. However, with the growth of competing institutions, enrollment declined, and by 1999, Rabbi Dr. Norman Lamm, President of Yeshiva University, wanted to close the high school down. When word of the imminent closure leaked out, Rabbi Michael Taubes, MTA's principal at that time, together with senior instructor, Rabbi Yitzchok Cohen, led a student protest and recitation of Psalms in front of the YU's main building at that time, Furst Hall. Although the protest led to Rabbi Taubes' dismissal, and eventually to the dismissal of Cohen as well (both became instructors in other divisions of Yeshiva University, and Rabbi Taubes in 2008 became a teacher at the high school and became principal again in 2011), their prompt action is credited with swaying Rabbi Lamm to not close the school. Rabbi Taubes was rehired by MTA to serve as the Rebbe (Teacher) of one of the two incoming freshmen honors Talmud classes for the 2008-2009 school year.

Rabbi Michael Hecht, who had been teaching at the school for many years and also served as a Dean in Yeshiva College, became Dean of MTA and effectively saved the school. In September 2005, Rabbi Mark Gottlieb, formerly the Principal of Maimonides Day School in Boston, assumed the role of Head of School. In February 2011, Rabbi Mark Gottlieb announced that he would be stepping down as Head of School/Menahel at the culmination of the 2010-2011 academic year. His successor was former principal Rabbi Michael Taubes, who took over as Head of School (now also known by the Hebrew title of Rosh HaYeshiva at the start of the 2011-2012 academic year. In October 2015 it was announced that the school would begin a search for a new Head of School. Rabbi Taubes would continue on in an evolved capacity as Rosh Yeshiva at both RIETS and the high school. In March 2016, it was announced that the school's next leader would be Rabbi Joshua Kahn, a noted and accomplished educator in the NY area. Rabbi Kahn began his tenure in July 2016.

Sexual Misconduct Allegations 

In December 2012, a scandal developed alleging widespread sexual misconduct by two high ranking male faculty members and perpetrated on multiple male students. The alleged misconduct, which occurred during the 1970s and 1980s, was claimed to have been known about, but ignored, by the highest levels of administration at the high school and at Yeshiva University. The current president of Yeshiva University issued a statement stating that the university will examine the allegations. The Jewish Week uncovered a story, further alleging knowledge of the inappropriate behavior by the university. The story alleges that the door to one of the abuser's offices was removed, possibly, to prevent a private environment where further misconduct could continue. The lawsuit against Yeshiva University was dismissed before trial in January 2014 by a federal judge who stated that the statute of limitations had expired.  However, when New York State passed its new Child Victims Act in 2019, the suit was refiled by 38 former students.

Beit Midrash Katan
In the '06-'07 school year, MTA (also known as Mesivta D'Yeshivas Rabbeinu Yitzchak Elchanan) started an advanced Talmud Shiur for the top 12th grade students called the Beis Medrash Katan, dedicated in memory of Julius Wrubel. The Beis Medrash Katan, commonly referred to as "BMK," has more hours for Torah study. The purpose of the program is to give the school's top Talmud students a feel for a real beit midrash, which many of the students will be enrolled in the following year and possibly many more. The Beis Medrash Katan also encourages its students to develop habits of "budding Talmidei Chachamim."  The Rebbe who teaches and supervises the Beis Medrash Katan is Rabbi Tanchum Cohen. In 2011-2012 Rabbi Michael Hecht joined the BMK staff, until his retirement in June 2014.

Student activities 

There are many extracurricular activities and clubs. For sports, these include Varsity and Junior Varsity basketball, hockey, and wrestling, as well as fencing, baseball, softball, swimming, and soccer teams. In other areas, there are College Bowl, Torah Bowl, Mock Trial, Model UN, Model Congress, Chess, SABR, Debate, MTAhackers, a 3d printing club, a Math team, as well as the Business and Finance Club. The Chess team won the Yeshiva League Chess Championship in both 2017 and 2018. The school has 2 robotics teams that participate in the FIRST Tech Challenge (teams 5361 and 13475). In 2018, team 13475 made it to the FTC East Super Regional, and in 2019-20 team 13475 made it through to the District Qualifiers, but was unable to compete due to coronavirus concerns.

The students also publish a number of publications including The Polis (multidisciplinary academic journal), The Academy News (school newspaper), Shema Koleinu (weekly Dvar Torah newsletter), Yagdil Torah (Torah essay journal),  HaTzioni (Zionist publication), Pearls of Wisdom (book of students' literary works and, as of 2011, artwork), and the Elchanite (yearbook).

The school organizes international trips for students. In 2004, a group of students spent Shavuot in Belarus in coordination with YUSSR. In 2005, the HaTzioni club, in cooperation with the Palau Mission to the United Nations, arranged a trip for its members to Palau to show the Jewish community's gratitude for Palau's support of Israel. There have also been trips to Turkey, Germany, Poland, and Israel.

Faculty
Head of School: Rabbi Joshua Kahn
Rosh Yeshiva: Rabbi Michael Taubes
Principal for General Studies: Rabbi Dov Emerson
Associate Principal: Rabbi Shimon Schenker
Director of Teaching and Learning: Leah Silvera

Grade Mashgichim/Deans:

Notable alumni

Information is from the annual Elchanite, YUHSB's yearbook.

Shalom Auslander, Author.
Robert J. Avrech, (BTA), noted screenwriter.
Rabbi Dr. Ari Berman, (MTA, Class of 1987), President of Yeshiva University
Gerald Blidstein, (1956), professor and winner of the Israel Prize
Rabbi Herbert Bomzer, (1945), Rabbi 
Rabbi Shlomo Brevda, (1947), Maggid.
Michael Broyde, professor of law
Rabbi Ephraim Buchwald, (1963), founder and president of the National Jewish Outreach Program (NJOP)
Rabbi Nachman Bulman, (1942), leading 20th century Rabbi.
Rabbi Hyman Chanover
Rabbi Zevulun Charlop, (1947), Dean (Menahel) Emeritus of Rabbi Isaac Elchanan Theological Seminary.
Samuel J. Danishefsky, Chemist
Rabbi Avishai David, (1967), Rosh Yeshiva of Yeshivat Torat Shraga.
Alan Dershowitz, (BTA), lawyer, author, professor at Harvard Law School
Rabbi Yechiel Eckstein, (1968), founder and current president of the International Fellowship of Christians and Jews.
Herb Edelman, (1959) Actor
Rabbi Shimon Eider, (BTA class of 1956), prominent Halachic authority.
Dr. Hillel Furstenberg, (1951), Leading Israeli mathematician and Winner of the Israel Prize and Abel Prize
Julius Genachowski, Former Chairman of the Federal Communications Commission
Rabbi Menachem Genack, (1965), CEO of the Orthodox Union Kosher Division.
Rabbi Mordechai Gifter (1933), Rosh Yeshiva of Telshe yeshiva, Cleveland, Ohio.
Elon Gold, (MTA, Class of 1988), Actor
Rabbi Dr. Irving Greenberg, (BTA class of 1949), scholar and author.
Jason Greenblatt, (MTA, Class of 1985), Executive Vice President and Chief Legal Officer at The Trump Organization
Rabbi David Hollander, (1945), Rabbi 
Rabbi Howard Jachter, Rabbi 
Rabbi Eli Jacobs, Rabbi in Yeshivas Sha'ar Yoshuv and motivational speaker.
Richard Joel, (1968), fourth president of Yeshiva University.
Dr. Alan Kadish, president of the Touro College and University System
Rabbi Meir Kahane, (BTA class of 1949), founder of the Jewish Defense League and former Israeli Knesset member.  Controversial activist.
Dr. Joseph Kaminetsky, Rabbi, first director of Torah Umesorah 
Max Kampelman (1937), American diplomat, Presidential Medal of Freedom awardee.
Rabbi Ephraim Kanarfogel, (1973), scholar of medieval Jewish history and rabbinic literature, and expert in Jewish law.
Bernard Lander (1933), founder and first president of Touro College
Howard Lasher, Politician 
Stan Kasten, (1969), president of the Los Angeles Dodgers, formerly president of the Atlanta Braves, Atlanta Hawks, Atlanta Thrashers, and Washington Nationals
Yossi Klein Halevi, (BTA class of 1971), author and journalist.
Rabbi Dr. Yehuda (Leo) Levi, (1942), author, of scholarly works on Jewish Studies and Optics.
Prof. Nat Lewin, (1953), lawyer.
Ralph Lauren, American fashion designer and business executive (did not graduate from MTA but attended the school for two years).
Rabbi Raphael Marcus, (1968), rabbi in the Toronto Jewish Community.
Bill Mazer (1937), American Radio and Television personality.
Rabbi Moses Mescheloff, (Class of 1926), leading 20th century Rabbi
Rabbi Avigdor Miller, leading 20th century Rabbi
Avi Muchnick (MTA, Class of 1997), Founder of Aviary
Velvel Pasternak (1951), authority on Jewish Music.
Chaim Potok, (1946), Jewish American author.
Rabbi Steven Pruzansky
Eli Rozenberg (2012), majority shareholder of El Al airline
Rabbi Emanuel Rackman, (class of 1927), leading 20th century Rabbi; President of Bar-Ilan University.
Rabbi Dr. Aaron Rakeffet-Rothkoff, (1955), scholar, author and teacher.
Rabbi Yona Reiss, Dean (Menahel) of Rabbi Isaac Elchanan Theological Seminary.
Rabbi Shlomo Riskin, (BTA class of 1956), Rabbinic leader in the US and in Israel, founder of Lincoln Square Synagogue and Chief Rabbi of Efrat.
Yair Rosenberg, (2006), journalist
Rabbi Itamar Rosensweig, Rabbi
Dr. Fred Rosner (1951), authority on Jewish Law and Medicine.
Rabbi Hershel Schachter, (1958), American Orthodox Rosh Yeshiva and Rabbinic authority.
Mordechai Shapiro, singer and entertainer
Rabbi Baruch Simon, Rosh Yeshiva 
Rabbi Ben-Tzion Spitz, Chief Rabbi of Uruguay 
Rabbi Pinchas Stolper
Daniel E. Straus (BTA), business executive 
Rabbi Moshe Dovid Tendler, Rosh Yeshiva and authority on Jewish medical ethics 
Prof. Eli Turkel, (1961), Professor of Applied Mathematics at the School of Mathematical Sciences, Tel Aviv University.
Stanley M. Wagner, Rabbi 
Rabbi Jeremy Wieder (1988), Rosh Yeshiva 
Prof. Steven Winter (1970)
Prof. Yosef H. Yerushalmi, (1948), Jewish historian and Salo Wittmayer Baron Professor of Jewish History, Culture and Society; director, Institute for Jewish and Israel Studies at Columbia University.
Dov S. Zakheim, (BTA class of 1966), Former official of the United States government (Under Secretary of Defense).
Zvi Zeitlin, (1939), Classical Violinist 
Jonathan Zizmor, (1962), dermatologist. 
Efraim Zuroff, (MTA, 1966), historian and Nazi Hunter

References

External links
Some Historic MSTA photos
MSTA yearbooks beginning in 1923
The Polis archives
Shema Koleinu archives

Educational institutions established in 1916
Private high schools in Manhattan
Yeshiva University
University-affiliated schools in the United States
Boys' schools in New York City
Orthodox Jewish educational institutions
Modern Orthodox Jewish day schools in the United States
1916 establishments in New York City